General Richard Philipps (1661 – 14 October 1750) was said to have been in the employ of William III as a young man and for his service gained the rank of captain in the British army. He served at the Battle of the Boyne in 1690 and promoted to Lieutenant Colonel in 1712.

He raised the 40th Regiment of Foot in August 1717. In 1717 he was appointed Governor of Nova Scotia by George I. He arrived in Annapolis Royal in 1720, created the Nova Scotia Council and in 1722 returned to England. He made another visit to Nova Scotia and persuaded the Acadian French to swear allegiance to the British Government. He returned again to England about 1731. During the early years he evidently was an active and responsible governor. After 1731 his interest in the province was much reduced. Because of absences and laterally, waning interest, the roles of those acting for the Governor were greatly enhanced. They were: John Doucett, (1717–1725); Lawrence Armstrong, (1725–1739); Alexander Cosby, 1739–1740; Paul Mascarene, (1740–1749). At that point Edward Cornwallis was appointed Governor.

See also
Lieutenant-Governors of Nova Scotia
Military history of Canada

References

External links 
 Government of Nova Scotia Archives

Governors of the Colony of Nova Scotia
40th Regiment of Foot officers
British Army generals
Suffolk Regiment officers
1661 births
1750 deaths
Burials at Westminster Abbey
Williamite military personnel of the Williamite War in Ireland